Olagbegi Atanneye II was a paramount ruler of Owo Kingdom, Ondo state, southwestern Nigeria and the father of Olagbegi Atanneye I and Olowo Ajike Ogunoye.

References

Yoruba monarchs
Nigerian traditional rulers
People from Owo
Olagbegi family